Sally Bowrey is an Australian journalist, television presenter and weather presenter for the Seven Network, based in Sydney, Australia.

Biography

Bowrey is currently news presenter on the Seven Network's Weekend Sunrise.

Early life and education 
Bowrey was born and raised in Sydney. She earned a degree in journalism from Charles Sturt University in Bathurst in 2003.

Career 
She began her career at Foxtel, anchoring Arena News Updates. In 2004 she became a weather presenter at The Weather Channel, where in 2005 she became the host of the morning programme, Your Weather Today.

For four years beginning in 2009, she worked at TVW in Perth, an affiliate of the Seven Network, as the weekend news presenter and as a reporter for the network's Western Australian news bulletin.

In 2012, Bowrey returned to Sydney, where she filled in as a weather presenter for Sarah Cumming whilst she was on maternity leave, and the following year, when Seven News began a live evening news bulletin, Seven News at 7, became the presenter for the Western Australia version. That programme was ended in April 2014; at the end of 2015 she again replaced Cumming during her maternity leave, as the weather presenter for the news bulletins at 4pm and 7pm, and she has since presented both weather and news on Sunrise, hosted coverage of the Queensland floods, and since 2016 been a presenter on Weekend Sunrise, where  she is the news and sport presenter.

Personal life 
Bowrey married Richard Seddon, a property development manager, in 2010; they have a son and a daughter.

References

External links 

Living people
Year of birth missing (living people)
Australian television journalists
Australian television presenters
Australian women television presenters
Australian women journalists
Journalists from Sydney
Charles Sturt University alumni